Thailand participated at the 2017 Summer Universiade, in Taipei, Taiwan.

Medals by sport

Medalists

References

 Thailand Overview

External links
Universiade Taipei 2017

Nations at the 2017 Summer Universiade
Thailand at the Summer Universiade
2017 in Thai sport